Wundersleben is a municipality in the Sömmerda district of Thuringia, Germany. Wundersleben means "life of miracles", or "miracles in life".

References

Sömmerda (district)